Carlos Rafael Gutiérrez (born September 22, 1986) is a Puerto Rican-American minor league pitcher who last played in the Chicago Cubs' organization in 2013. The 6'3" tall, 205 lbs. right-hander was selected by the Twins in the first round (27th overall) of the 2008 Major League Baseball draft. He entered the  season ranked as the Twins seventh best prospect by Baseball America.

Following the  season, he pitched for Gigantes de Carolina of the Winter Liga de Beisbol Profesional de Puerto Rico, and with Puerto Rico in the 2009 World Baseball Classic. Gutierrez pitched one inning of Puerto Rico's 7-0 victory over Panama in round one of the World Baseball Classic.

He appeared in 32 games with New Britain with 122 innings pitched and went 5-8 with a 4.57 ERA before being promoted to Triple-A in September 2010.

References

See also
, or Minor League Baseball

1986 births
Living people
2009 World Baseball Classic players
Fort Myers Miracle players
New Britain Rock Cats players
Rochester Red Wings players